The Benham Rise, officially known as Philippine Rise, is an extinct volcanic ridge located in the Philippine Sea approximately  east of the northern coastline of Dinapigue, Isabela. The rise has been known to the people of Catanduanes as Kalipung-awan as early as the precolonial era of the Philippines, which literally means "loneliness from an isolated place".

Under the Philippine Sea lie a number of basins including the West Philippine Basin, inside of which is located the Central Basin Fault (CBF).  The Philippine Plateau is located in the CBF and its basement probably is a micro-continent.  Several scientific surveys have been made on the feature to study its nature and its impact on tectonic subduction, including one about its effects on the 1990 Luzon earthquake. The Philippines claimed this feature as part of its continental shelf in a claim filed with the United Nations Commission on the Limits of the Continental Shelf on April 8, 2009, and which was approved under the United Nations Convention on the Law of the Sea (UNCLOS) in 2012.

The rise is designated as a "protected food supply exclusive zone" by the Philippine government since May 2017. Mining and oil exploration are banned in the Philippine Plateau as it is a protected area. On May 16, 2017, President Rodrigo Duterte signed Executive Order No. 25, renaming the feature to "Philippine Rise".

History

Survey by Admiral Benham
The landform was presumably named after Admiral Andrew Ellicot Kennedy Benham (1832–1905) by American surveyors who probably surveyed the geological feature. He was a United States Navy officer, who served with both the South Atlantic and West Gulf Blockading Squadrons during the American Civil War.

Studies following the 1990 Luzon earthquake
There has been speculation in the scientific community about the nature of the landform. Following the major July 16 1990 Luzon earthquake, scientists reconsidered their fault models and decided it likely that Philippine Plateau has similarly displaced the Philippine Fault System to the west. After analyzing older models such as that of Pinet and Stephan (1989), scientists reconsidered their fault models. They thought that it is highly likely that the Philippine Plateau is still displacing Central Luzon and the Philippine Fault System to the west, which may have had an impact in causing such a catastrophic earthquake. The 20-second to 50-second wave in the 1990 quake that developed a new east–west sub-fault was so strong that it terminated disastrously at the city of Baguio in Benguet, Cordillera. Several scientific surveys, conducted between 2004 and 2008, collected hydrographic data that determined the morphology of the seabed in the region.

United Nations recognition of the Philippine claim 

Despite its proximity to the archipelago, the plateau was previously not included in the territory of the Philippines. On April 8, 2009, the Republic of the Philippines lodged a partial territorial waters claim with the United Nations Commission on the Limits of the Continental Shelf in relation to the continental shelf in the region of the Philippine Rise. It was submitted as part of petition expanding the archipelago's baselines and exclusive economic zone through a law that also included other claims involving disputed territories of the Kalayaan Islands (Spratly Islands) and Scarborough Shoal.

The Congress of the Philippines enacted the bill of Senator Miriam Defensor Santiago, now known as Republic Act No. 9522, or the Archipelagic Baselines Law, which is the basis of the claim. It asserted that, according to scientific data based on seismic, magnetic, other geological features, the Philippine Rise is an extension of the Philippines' continental shelf. The claim is only a partial claim since the law that allows the Philippines to expand its territorial boundaries also includes islands in the South China Sea.

The Philippines filed its claim for Benham Rise in 2008 in compliance with the requirements of the United Nations Convention on the Law of the Seas. The UN officially approved the claim in April 2012 under the administration of President Noynoy Aquino. It was the first claim of the Philippines approved by an international body since the colonial era.

After Chinese survey ships were spotted in the region in 2017, Philippine president Rodrigo Duterte suggested that the plateau be renamed to emphasize the Philippine's sovereignty over the area. Soon after, the Department of Foreign Affairs announced plans to come up with a new name. In May 2017, the Philippine government officially adopted the name "Philippine Rise" for the feature and designated the area as a "protected food supply exclusive zone" and prohibited mining and oil exploration in the Philippine Plateau, angering China in the process. China maintained that the Philippines has no sovereign rights or sovereignty over the Philippine Rise despite a UN-backed international ruling in 2012 that says otherwise.

Chinese research and naming of features in 2018

In January 2018, Filipino Congressman Gary Alejano revealed that the Department of Foreign Affairs had approved the Chinese Institute of Oceanology of the Chinese Academy of Sciences together with the Marine Science Institute of the University of the Philippines to perform a scientific survey of the Rise.

In February, Duterte's agriculture secretary told media that Duterte has now ordered the halting of all foreign researches in the Philippines Rise, however, the research being conducted by the Chinese Academy of Sciences was already finished two days before the halt order.

On February 12, 2018, the International Hydrographic Organization approved the names proposed by China for five features in the Philippine Rise after China submitted to the organization its research findings on the area. The names given by China were all in Chinese, namely, Jinghao Seamount (some 70 nautical miles east of Cagayan), Tianbao Seamount (some 70 nautical miles east of Cagayan), Haidonquing Seamount (east at 190 nautical miles), Cuiqiao Hill, and Jujiu Seamount, the last two form the central peaks of the Philippine Rise undersea geological province. The Chinese naming of the features met public protests in the Philippines. The Presidential Palace announced that it objects and it shall not recognize the Chinese names of the features and it will appeal for its rejection in the International Hydrographic Organization. The Philippine government also said that their embassy in Beijing will coordinate with the Chinese regarding the issue. A day later, the Palace announced that they intend to give Philippine names on the features of the Philippine Rise. However, a few hours later, the presidential palace clarified that it has 'no problem' with the Chinese names in the Philippine Rise.

On February 16, the Philippine government announced that they have sent military personnel into Cagayan Valley to guard the Rise. Two days later, it was revealed that China intends to name a total of 142 features. On February 26, the Department of Foreign Affairs stated during a Senate investigation that China actually surveyed the Rise in 2017 without any Philippine-issued permit, citing the lack of capability to detect illegal entry.

Discovery of Apolaki Caldera

The world's largest caldera with a diameter of 150 kilometers was recently discovered by Jenny Anne Baretto, a Filipina marine geophysicist. It was named after Apolaki, the mythical Filipino god of the sun and war.

Geology

Philippine Rise is a submerged extinct volcanic ridge located at 16 degrees 30 minutes N, 124 degrees 45 minutes E off the coast of Luzon, with the size of about 250 km in diameter and rises over 2,000 meters (2 km.) above the sea floor, from below 5,000 meters (5 km.) below sea level to above 3,000 meters (3 km.) below sea level. Its area is close to the Philippine Seamount, located at 15 degrees 48 minutes N, 124 degrees 15 minutes E. The precise location is somewhere near the east of the Philippine Trench and near the south of the East Luzon Trench, both of which absorb the subducting force of the Philippine Sea Plate under the Philippine Mobile Belt, a collage of large blocks of that crust that amalgamated prior to the collision of the Philippine Sea Plate with the Eurasian Plate.

The origin of the landform, along with the nearby Urdaneta Plateau (a remnant of a mantle plume), is identified in one study as at least five sequences of propagating rifts, probably triggered by mantle flowing away from the mantle thermal anomaly. Its presence of the landform disrupts the continuity of this region (known as the Philippine-East Luzon Trench) by continuously colliding with the Sierra Madre mountain range of eastern portion of the island of Luzon. Though it is generally thought that the Philippine Sea Plate is being subducted under the Philippine Mobile Belt, under the rules of tectonic subduction, there appears to be a resistance to this because of the presence of the landform, and instead, the plate is being displaced into the northern portion of Luzon to the west.

The geophysical features of the plateau may have been the result of an early Miocene collision event between the Philippine Rise and the eastern margin of Luzon, which may have also allowed the inception of the NW striking strand of the Philippine fault. These forces may have impacted the shape of the island of Luzon because of the basaltic sea floor resisting the subduction that may have also cause the bending of the Philippine Fault. The active basins in Central Luzon, which trace an asymmetrical V shape, is the best place to observe recent tectonic evolution of the fault system.

The Benham Bank is the shallowest point of the Philippine Rise.

Cultural and strategic significance
Philippine Rise has been part of the culture of ancient Filipinos. Ancient Catanduanes people have fished and roamed the area long before the colonial era. In fact, it is celebrated in Catandunganons' folktales, legends and poetry. Today, large percentage of fish caught by Catandunganon comes from Philippine Rise. Its local Catandunganon term is called Kalipung-awan (means loneliness in an isolated place), as fisherfolks who catch marine life in the area for days often feel loneliness due to the area's vast waters which is seldom fished by other ethnic peoples aside from those living in Catanduanes. Its strategic location southeast of Taiwan, east of Luzon, and west of American territory of Guam make it a feature of geopolitical importance.

In May 2017, the feature has been designated by the Philippines as a "protected food supply exclusive zone" prohibiting mining and oil exploration in the Philippine Plateau.

References

External links 

Extinct volcanoes
Landforms of the Philippines
Law of the sea
Natural history of the Philippines
Philippine Sea
Philippine tectonics
Plateaus of the Pacific Ocean
Protected areas of the Philippines